Nurpur Assembly constituency is one of the 68 constituencies in the Himachal Pradesh Legislative Assembly. Nurpur is part of Kangra Lok Sabha constituency.

Members of Legislative Assembly

Election results

2022 
Himachal Pradesh Legislative Assembly, 2022:: Nurpur

2017

See also
 Nurpur, Himachal Pradesh
 Kangra district
 List of constituencies of Himachal Pradesh Legislative Assembly

References

External links
 

Assembly constituencies of Himachal Pradesh
Kangra district